The  was a diplomatic note signed in Washington between the United States and the Empire of Japan on 2 November 1917 over their disputes with regards to China. Both parties agreed to respect the independence and territorial integrity of China and to follow the principle of equal opportunity for commerce and industry in that country. The United States recognized Japan had special interests in certain areas, especially Manchuria. The Chinese objected to the agreement and it was abrogated in 1923.

In a secret protocol, which was attached to the public agreement, both parties agreed not to take advantage of the special opportunities presented by World War I to seek special rights or privileges in China at the expense of other nations that had been allied in the war effort against Germany.

At the time, the Lansing–Ishii Agreement was touted as evidence that Japan and the United States had laid to rest their increasingly-acrimonious rivalry over China, and the agreement was hailed as a landmark in Japanese–American relations. However, critics soon realized that the vagueness and the differing possible interpretations of the agreement meant that nothing had really been decided after two months of talks. The agreement was abrogated in April 1923, when it was replaced by the Nine-Power Treaty.

For the Japanese, the Lansing–Ishii Agreement, which acknowledged Tokyo's special interests in part of China and recognized that Japan could not easily be ignored in international affairs.

See also
 Japan–United States relations
 Taft–Katsura Agreement

References

 Beers, Burton F. Vain Endeavor. Robert Lansing's Attempts to End the American-Japanese Rivalry (1962)

 Vinson, J. Chal. "The Annulment of the Lansing-Ishii Agreement." Pacific Historical Review (1958): 57-69. Online
 Young, C. Walter. The International Legal Status Of The Kwantung Leased Territory (1931) online

External links
The Imperial Japanese Mission to the United States, 1917, Appendix B. – Containing full public text of the Agreement

Notes

1917 in the United States
1917 in Japan
Japan–United States treaties
China–Japan relations
Treaties concluded in 1917
Treaties of the Empire of Japan